Vereador José Diniz will be a monorail station of Line 17-Gold of ViaMobilidade, which is currently under construction, and will connect Line 9-Emerald to Congonhas Airport.

Vereador José Diniz station will be placed in the crossing of Avenida Jornalista Roberto Marinho with Avenida Vereador José Diniz.

Initially, in the São Paulo Metro expansion plans, Line 17-Gold should be open until 2014, connecting with São Paulo–Morumbi station of Line 4-Yellow, at the time that Morumbi Stadium was considered one of the hosts for 2014 FIFA World Cup.

After that, the promise of opening of the line was delayed to 2016, end of 2017, 2018, December 2020, mid of 2021, and, currently, to 2nd semester of 2022.

Toponymy
The station was named after the avenue that cross the station, Vereador José Diniz. José de Oliveira Almeida Diniz was born in Campinas in 7 April 1909 and was, for many times, city councillor in the Municipal Chamber of São Paulo, always representing the borough of Santo Amaro for the Brazilian Labor Party (PTB) and the Brazilian Democratic Movement (MDB). Elect for one more term, died by a heart attack on 5 January 1973. Later, Avenida Conselheiro Rodrigues Alves was renamed after him by the Executive Order no. 11,689 of 13 January 1975.

Station layout

References

São Paulo Metro stations
Proposed railway stations in Brazil
Railway stations scheduled to open in 2024